The Jack Graney Award is presented by the Canadian Baseball Hall of Fame & Museum to a member of the Canadian media for their contributions to the game of baseball in Canada. The award is not presented every year, but rather when the committee believes there to be a worthy candidate.

The award takes its name from Jack Graney, one of the first Canadian baseball players to enjoy success in the major leagues, and one of the first notable Canadian baseball broadcasters.

Recipients of the award

See also
Canadian baseball awards

References

Baseball in Canada
Baseball trophies and awards
Canadian journalism awards
Canadian sports trophies and awards

Awards established in 1987
1987 establishments in Ontario